Small RNA (sRNA) are polymeric RNA molecules that are less than 200 nucleotides in length, and are usually non-coding. RNA silencing is often a function of these molecules, with the most common and well-studied example being RNA interference (RNAi), in which endogenously expressed microRNA (miRNA) or exogenously derived small interfering RNA (siRNA) induces the degradation of complementary messenger RNA. Other classes of small RNA have been identified, including piwi-interacting RNA (piRNA) and its subspecies repeat associated small interfering RNA (rasiRNA). Small RNA "is unable to induce RNAi alone, and to accomplish the task it must form the core of the RNA–protein complex termed the RNA-induced silencing complex (RISC), specifically with Argonaute protein".

Small RNA have been detected or sequenced using a range of techniques, including directly by MicroRNA sequencing on several sequencing platforms, or indirectly through genome sequencing and analysis.  Identification of miRNAs has been evaluated in detecting human disease, such as breast cancer. Peripheral blood mononuclear cell (PBMC) miRNA expression has been studied as potential biomarker for different neurological disorders such as Parkinson's disease, Multiple sclerosis.  Evaluating small RNA is useful for certain kinds of study because its molecules "do not need to be fragmented prior to library preparation".

Types of small RNA include:
 microRNA (miRNA)
 Piwi-interacting RNA (piRNA)
 small interfering RNA (siRNA)
 small nuclear RNA (snRNA), also commonly referred to as U-RNA
 small nucleolar RNA (snoRNA)
 small rDNA-derived RNA (srRNA)
 tRNA fragment (tRF)
 Y RNA-derived small RNA (ysRNA)

In plants
The first known function in plants was discovered in mutants of Arabidopsis. Specifically with decline in function mutations for RNA-dependent RNA polymerase and DICER-like production. This impairment actually enhanced Arabidopsis resistance against Heterodera schachtii and Meloidogyne javanica. Similarly, mutants with reduced Argonaute function - ago1-25, ago1-27, ago2-1, and combined mutants with ago1-27 and ago2-1 - had greater resistance to Meloidogyne incognita. Altogether this demonstrates great dependence of nematode parasitism on plants' own small RNAs.

References 

Non-coding RNA

de:Kleine RNA
hr:Mala RNK